Michel Ruhl (2 February 1934 – 15 January 2022) was a French actor.

Life and career
He began his career in 1952 under the direction of Gérard Philipe. He held his first major role in the theatre with a staging of Long Day's Journey into Night at the Théâtre Hébertot in Paris.

In addition to his acting career, Ruhl was well known for dubbing. He was known for playing the voices of James Cromwell, Scott Wilson, and Terence Stamp.

Ruhl died in Guérande on 15 January 2022, at the age of 87.

Filmography

Cinema
Your Shadow is Mine (1963)
Nick Carter and Red Club (1965)
Nouveau journal d'une femme en blanc (1966)
 (1973)
 (1975)
 (1976)
Police Python 357 (1976)
If I Had to Do It All Over Again (1976)
The Toy (1976)
La Menace (1977)
Death of a Corrupt Man (1977)
 (1978)
 (1979)
 (1980)
La provinciale (1981)
 (1989)
Wild Reeds (1994)
Coco Chanel & Igor Stravinsky (2009)

Short film
Il va faire jour mon amour (2013)

References

1934 births
2022 deaths
20th-century French male actors
French male film actors
Video game actors
French stage actors